The European Information Technologies Certification Institute (EITCI) is an international non-profit organisation headquartered in Brussels, Belgium, aimed primarily towards promotion of digital literacy and prevention of digital exclusion, by providing standards for the certification of knowledge and skills in the area of information and communication technologies, in accordance to the European Commission's guidelines. EITCI is not an official EU organization.

Knowledge and skills certification standards
EITCI provides constant development, governance, and certification of the following professional ICT knowledge and skills certification standards:

 European Information Technologies Certification (EITC) programme - provides certification of individuals' knowledge and skills in narrow, specialized single-subject areas of ICT such as Office software, Computer-aided project management, Online collaboration systems, Raster graphics processing.
 European Information Technologies Certification Academy (EITCA) programme - provides certification of individuals' knowledge and skills in broader field-oriented areas of ICT expertise such as Computer graphics, Information security etc. The EITCA programmes, referred to as EITCA Academies, include selected sets of several to over a dozen of individual EITC programmes, that together comprise a particular area of qualifications.

See also
 EITCA programme
 EITC programme

References

International organisations based in Belgium
Information technology education
Information technology organizations based in Europe
Standards organisations in Belgium